Pere Riba was the defending champion but did not participate.

Aljaž Bedene won the title, defeating Márton Fucsovics in the final, 2–6, 7–6(7–4), 6–4.

Seeds

 Andreas Haider-Maurer (semifinals)
 Máximo González (quarterfinals)
 Filippo Volandri (second round)
 Norbert Gomboš (quarterfinals)
 Aljaž Bedene (champion)
 Andrej Martin (second round)
 Thomas Fabbiano (first round)
 Andrea Arnaboldi (second round)

Draw

Finals

Top half

Bottom half

References
 Main Draw
 Qualifying Draw

Distal and ITR Group Tennis Cup - Singles
2014 - Singles